Ancient Civilizations from Scythia to Siberia is a peer-reviewed academic journal the ancient and medieval history and archaeology of the former Soviet Union. The editor-in-chief is Askold Ivantchik. The journal is published by Brill and indexed in Academic Search Complete and Scopus.

External links 
 

Archaeology journals
History journals
Brill Publishers academic journals
Publications established in 1995
English-language journals